Ex parte Fisk, 113 U.S. 713 (1885), was a case in which Francis B. Fogg brought suit in the Supreme Court of the State of New York against Fisk to recover the sum of $63,250 on the allegation of false and fraudulent representations made by Fisk in the sale of certain mining stocks. Fisk was held in contempt when he declined to answer questions his attorney believed violated the Fifth Amendment.

Background
From that suit, the plaintiff obtained the following court order:

A motion to vacate this order was overruled, and the judgment affirmed by the Court of Appeals.

The defendant then appeared before the court and submitted to a partial examination, answering some questions and objecting to others, until, pending one of the adjournments of the examination, he procured an order removing the case to the circuit court of the United States. In that court, an order was made to continue the examination before a master, to whom the matter was referred. The defendant refusing to be sworn and declining to be examined, he was brought before the circuit court on an application for attachment for a contempt in refusing to obey the order.

Without disposing of this motion, the circuit court made another order, to-wit:

It is hereby ordered and adjudged that the motion to punish the said defendant for such contempt stand adjourned to the next motion day of this court, to-wit, on the 28th day of March, 1884."
It is further ordered that the defendant Clinton B. Fisk, be, and he is hereby, directed and required to attend personally on the 14th day of March, 1884, before the Honorable Addison Brown, one of the judges of this court at a stated term thereof at his chambers in the post office building in said City of New York at eleven o'clock in the forenoon of that day, then and there, and on such other days as may be designated, to be examined and his testimony and deposition taken, and continued as a party before trial, pursuant to section 870 et seq. of the Code of Civil Procedure, and for the purposes mentioned in said order of January 12, 1883, and February 12, 1884, heretofore made in this action."

The defendant appeared before the court in pursuance of this order and, stating that he was advised by counsel that the court had no jurisdiction to require him to answer in this manner to the questions propounded to him by the counsel for plaintiff, he refused to do so to avoid self incrimination. For this, on further proceeding, he was held by the court to be in contempt and fined $500 and committed to the custody of the marshal until it was paid. It is to be relieved of this imprisonment that he prays here the writ of habeas corpus.

Decision
Justice Miller delivered the opinion of the court. He stated the facts as above recited and continued:

Justice Miller went on to give an illustration from act of Congress prescribing rules of evidence in § 858 of the Revised Statutes, which read:

Specifically the following sections of the Revised Statutes, in chapter XVII, on evidence:

SEC. 861. The mode of proof, in the trial of actions at common law, shall be by oral testimony and examination of witnesses in open court, except as hereinafter provided.
SEC. 863. The testimony of any witness may be taken in any civil cause, pending in a district or circuit court, by deposition de bene esse when the witness lives at a greater distance from the place of trial than one hundred miles, or is bound on a voyage to sea, or is about to go out of the United States, or out of the district in which the case is to be tried, and to a greater distance than one hundred miles from the place of trial, before the time of trial, or when he is ancient or infirm.
The remainder of this section and §§ 864 and 865 are directory as to the officer before whom the deposition may be taken, the notice to the opposite party, and the manner of taking, testifying, and returning the deposition to the court.
SEC. 866. In any case where it is necessary, in order to prevent a failure or delay of justice, any of the courts of the United States may grant a dedimus potestatum to take depositions according to common usage, and any circuit court, upon application to it as a court of equity, may, according to the usages of chancery, direct depositions to be taken in perpetuam rei memoriam, if they relate to any matter that may be cognizable in any court of the United States.
Section 867 authorizes the courts of the United States, in their discretion and according to the practice in the state courts, to admit evidence so taken, and §§ 868, 869, and 870 prescribe the manner of taking such depositions, and of the use of the subpoena duces tecum, and how it may be obtained. No one can examine these provisions for procuring testimony to be used in the courts of the United States and have any reasonable doubt that, so far as they apply, they were intended to provide a system to govern the practice in that respect in those courts. They are, in the first place, too complete, too far-reaching, and too minute to admit of any other conclusion. But we have not only this inference from the character of the legislation, but it is enforced by the express language of the law in providing a defined mode of proof in those courts, and in specifying the only exceptions to that mode which shall be admitted.
This mode is "by oral testimony and examination of witnesses in open court, except as hereinafter provided."

Justice Miller continued: 

The court found that if the acts of Congress forbid the use of this kind of testimony in the courts of the United States, no order for taking it made in the state court while the case was pending in that court, with a view to its use on a trial there, can change the law of evidence in the federal court. In that case, after it had been once heard on appeal in the Supreme Court of Illinois, it was removed into the circuit court of the United States.

A writ would be issued on application to the clerk.

See also
List of United States Supreme Court cases, volume 113

References

External links
 

1885 in United States case law
Legal history of New York (state)
United States Supreme Court cases
United States Supreme Court cases of the Waite Court
United States Fifth Amendment self-incrimination case law
United States habeas corpus case law
Fraud trials